Coniferous swamps are forested wetlands in which the dominant trees are lowland conifers such as northern white cedar (Thuja occidentalis). The soil in these swamp areas is typically saturated for most of the growing season and is occasionally inundated by seasonal storms or by winter snow melt. 

The substrate is usually organic in nature and may contain peat in varying amounts or be composed entirely of muck.  The swamp substrate is typically nutrient-rich and neutral to alkaline, but can be acidic and nutrient-poor. 

Coniferous swamps vary in composition, with different species of conifer dominating, and varying amounts of deciduous hardwoods growing within the swamp. A wide diversity of plants is represented within the swamps, with certain species dominating in a variety of microhabitats dependent on factors such as available sunlight (as in cases of trees downed by wind or disease), Soil pH, standing groundwater, and differences of elevation within the swamp such as tussocks and nurse logs.

The different types of coniferous swamps are referred to according to their dominant trees. Rich conifer swamp is dominated by northern white cedar and typically occurs south of the climatic tension zone throughout the Midwest and northeastern United States and adjacent areas in Canada. North of the climatic tension zone, tamarack (Larix laricina) is the dominant species of conifer in minerotrophic wetlands classified as rich tamarack swamp. A roughly equal mix of hardwood trees and conifers is known as a hardwood-conifer swamp.

Rich conifer swamp

Flora

Trees

A variety of both evergreen and deciduous trees may be present in the rich conifer swamp in addition to the dominant species.
Thuja occidentalis: Northern white cedar, the dominant conifer, also known as arborvitae, a common landscape specimen in northern U.S. states and Canada.
Abies balsamea: Balsam fir
Acer rubrum: Red maple
Betula papyrifera: Paper birch
Cornus stolonifera: Red-osier dogwood
Cornus florida: Flowering dogwood
Larix laricina: Tamarack
Picea mariana: Black spruce
Picea glauca: White spruce
Pinus strobus: White pine
 Taxodium distichum: Bald cypress 
Tsuga canadensis: Hemlock
Ulmus americana: American elm
Populus tremuloides: Quaking aspen
Populus balsamifera: Balsam poplar
Nyssa aquatica: Water tupelo
Nyssa ogeche: White tupelo
Nyssa sylvatica: Black tupelo
Alnus glutinosa: Common alder

Shrubs
Alnus rugosa Tag elder
Ilex verticillata Winterberry
Ilex mucronata Mountain holly
Sambucus racemosa Red elderberry 
Gaylussacia baccata Huckleberry
Taxus canadensis Canadian yew
Lonicera canadensis American fly honeysuckle 
Lonicera oblongifolia Swamp fly honeysuckle 
Vaccinium angustifolium Low sweet blueberry
Vaccinium myrtilloides Canada blueberry 
Ribes americanum Wild black currant 
Ribes triste Swamp red currant 
Ribes lacustre Swamp black currant

Vines
Toxicodendron radicans Poison ivy
Lonicera dioica Limber honeysuckle

Ferns
Osmunda cinnamomea Cinnamon fern
Thelypteris palustris Marsh fern
Osmunda spectabilis Royal fern 
Gymnocarpium dryopteris Oak fern

Gramminoids
A variety of grasses and sedges may be present including multiple varieties of carex.
Glyceria striata Fowl manna grass

Mosses
Callicladium haldanianum Callicladium moss
Sphagnum centrale

Orchids
Cypripedium calceolus Yellow lady’s-slipper
Platanthera hyperborea Tall northern bog orchid

Forbs
Aquilegia canadensis Red Columbine

See also

 Freshwater swamp forest
 Peat swamp forest
 Swamp

References

Swamps
Conifers